Norman Field (second quarter 1936 – 13 January 2008) was an English professional rugby league footballer who played in the 1950s and 1960s.

Background
Norman Field's birth was registered in Huddersfield district, West Riding of Yorkshire, England, he started his rugby career whilst serving in the British Army, with the Duke of Wellington's Regiment, he ran a motorcycle business on Bradford Road, Batley throughout his rugby days, in the early 1980s he and his wife Susan moved to Torquay to run a hotel, which they converted into flats circa-2005, he died aged 71 from cancer in Torquay, Devon.

Playing career

International honours
Norman Field won a cap for Great Britain while at Batley: he played , i.e. number 5, in the 2–28 defeat by Australia at Wembley Stadium, London, on Wednesday 16 October 1963.

County honours
Norman Field was selected for Yorkshire County XIII while at Batley during the 1963–64 season.

Club career
Norman Field was transferred from Lockwood ARLFC to Batley during January 1954, he was transferred from Batley to Featherstone Rovers, he made his début for Featherstone Rovers on Thursday 15 August 1957, he played his last match for Featherstone Rovers during the 1957–58 season, he was transferred from Featherstone Rovers to Batley, he was subject of a transfer bid from Huddersfield in early-1964, but they were unwilling to meet Batley's valuation of £6,000 (based on increases in average earnings, this would be approximately £229,800 in 2018), and he subsequently retired from rugby league in 1964 aged-28 to concentrate on his business interests.

Genealogical information
Norman Field was married to Susan. Norman Field's previous marriage to Wilma (née Mark) was registered during first quarter 1959 in Huddersfield district, they had children; Christopher M. Field second quarter  in Huddersfield district),  Darrell A. Field second quarter  in Huddersfield district), and Jonathan Field.

References

External links
!Great Britain Statistics at englandrl.co.uk (statistics currently missing due to not having appeared for both Great Britain, and England)
Norman Field - A Former Great Britain rugby league player has lost his battle against cancer.
Video 'Rugby League Test - Britain Suffers Massacre' at aparchive.com
Search for "Norman Field" at britishnewspaperarchive.co.uk

1936 births
2008 deaths
Batley Bulldogs players
Duke of Wellington's Regiment soldiers
English rugby league players
Featherstone Rovers players
Great Britain national rugby league team players
Rugby league wingers
Rugby league players from Huddersfield
Yorkshire rugby league team players